Kaila Yu is a Taiwanese American singer, songwriter, former model, and freelance journalist for The Rolling Stone, CNN, Glamour, and more. She was formerly the lead singer and vocalist for the all-Asian-American, female rock band Nylon Pink. In addition to having Yu on the lead vocals, Nylon Pink also features Katt Lee on the bass, Kiki Wongo as the lead guitarist, Jamie Scoles on the drums and Yuki Ito on the keyboards. Yu is also one of the founders of the jewelry/fashion line "Hello Drama" which is affiliated with the Nylon Pink band and style.

She has also been an import model and appeared in magazines including Stuff Magazine, Maxim, FHM and House of Roses. Yu had a brief role in Dark Blue, appeared as a race girl in The Fast and the Furious: Tokyo Drift, and also hosted shows on channels such as MTV Asia, MTV Chi, Music Plus TV, TorqueTV, Octane TV and Ripe TV.

Yu is a graduate of UCLA (with a degree in economics), after transferring there from the University of California, San Diego, where she initially majored in biology.

References

External links

Nylon Pink on Reverb Nation
Hello Drama Jewelry and Fashion Line

Kaila Yu's Official Website
Kaila Yu's PR Company

Living people
Taiwanese emigrants to the United States
American musicians of Taiwanese descent
American models of Taiwanese descent
American women singer-songwriters
1979 births
American women pop singers
21st-century American women singers
21st-century American singers
American singer-songwriters